Howard Armstrong may refer to:
Howard Armstrong (musician) (1909–2003), country blues musician
Howard Armstrong (baseball) (1889–1926), baseball player
Howard E. Armstrong (1903–1983), Vermont Secretary of State

See also
Edwin Howard Armstrong (1890–1954), American inventor
Ernest Howard Armstrong (1864–1946), Canadian politician and journalist